Mani Neumeier (Manfred Neumeier, born 31 December 1940 in Munich) is a German rock musician, free-jazz drummer, artist, and frontman (singer and drummer) of the German Krautrock-band Guru Guru.

Probably best known for his work with Guru Guru, Neumeier collaborated with numerous bands and artists, such as Dieter Möbius, Damo Suzuki, Harmonia, Hans-Karsten Raecke, Irène Schweizer, Peter Brötzmann, Sonny Sharrock, Uchihashi Kazuhisa, Jojo Hiroshige, Kawabata Makoto, Yoshida Tatsuya, and Luigi Archetti. Neumeier has lived in Germany and Japan. The wax museum of Tokyo has a wax figure of him. He has also regularly collaborated with Japanese jam and noise bands Acid Mothers Temple and Hijokaidan.

Discography

Solo 

 1981 Mani Neumeier
 1983 Waldmeister (limited MC)
 1992 Privat
 1993 Terra Amphibia 
 1998 Terra Amphibia 2
 2002 Birthday !
 2005 Terra Amphibia 3 - Deep In The Jungle
 2007 Sketches aka Mani
 2009 Smoking The Contracts

With Guru Guru 

See: Guru Guru

Collaborations and guest appearances 

()

 1967 Humair, Favre, Antolini, Neumeier, Gruntz From Sticksland With Love
 1967 Irène Schweizer Trio Jazz Meets India
 1967 Globe Unity Orchestra
 1967 Irène Schweizer Trio Early Tapes
 1967 Wolfgang Dauner Free Action
 1975 Harmonia Deluxe
 1975 Highdelberg
 1982 Ensemble Yniverze Ensemble Yniverze
 1982 Moebius, Plank, Neumeier Zero Set
 1983 L.S. Bearforce L.S. Bearforce
 1986 Alfred Harth Red Art
 1989 Der Blaue Hirsch Cyberpunk
 1989 Unknownmix Whaba
 1992 Der Blaue Hirsch Brain Drain
 1992 Tiere Der Nacht Hot Stuff
 1994 Tiere Der Nacht Wolpertinger
 1996 Cosmic Couriers Other Places
 1996 Mani Neumeier & Peter Hollinger Monsters Of Drums
 1997 Irène Schweizer & Mani Neumeier European Masters Of Improvisation
 1997 Möbius, Engler, Neumeier Space Explosion
 1997 Damo Suzuki's Network Tokyo On Air West 30-April
 1997 Damo Suzuki's Network Tokyo On Air West 2-May
 1997 Damo Suzuki's Network Osaka Muse Hall 4-May
 1997 Tiere Der Nacht Evergreens
 1998 Neumeier & Hollinger Monsters Of Drums Meets The Demons Of Bali
 1998 Tiere Der Nacht Sleepless
 2000 Damo Suzuki's Network Jpn Ultd 1
 2001 Lover 303 Modern Fairytales
 2001 Hans-Karsten Raecke & Mani Neumeier Pescanned Passages
 2002 Achim Jaroscheck & Mani Neumeier Europlosion
 2002 Damo Suzuki's Network Jpn Ultd 2
 2003 Möbius + Neumeier Live In Japan
 2003 Neumeier Genrich Schmidt Psychedelic Monsterjam
 2005 Neumeier Genrich Schmidt Intergalactic Travel Agency
 2006 Acid Mothers Guru Guru Psychedelic Navigator (Live Collaboration with Acid Mothers Temple)
 2007 Möbius + Neumeier Zero Set II
 2008 Acid Mothers Temple Festival Vol. 5 DVD (Live Collaboration with Acid Mothers Temple)
 2010 Hans Reffert & Mani Neumeier Der Teufel und sein Guru
 2014 Cosmic Couriers Another Other Places

References

External links
 Guru Guru & Mani Neumeier - official web site (also known as www.guru-guru.com)
 Fünfundvierzig (45) - a record label, releasing music by Mani Neumeier (also by Damo Suzuki).

1940 births
Living people
Musicians from Munich
German rock singers
German rock drummers
Male drummers
German male musicians
Krautrock
German jazz drummers
German male jazz musicians